OpenMDX is an open-source model-driven architecture (MDA) software platform, a framework suited for domain-driven design (DDD). It is based on the Object Management Group's MDA standards. OpenMDX supports Java SE, Java EE, and .NET runtime environments. openMDX enables software architects and developers to build and integrate software applications in an automated and industrialized way.

See also

References

External links
 OpenMDX Homepage
 Introduction to OpenMDX
 Getting started with OpenMDX 2.4 (wiki pages)

Computer-aided software engineering tools
Software using the BSD license